is a 1987 Japanese anime OVA release directed by Yuji Moriyama. It is the sequel to the 1986 theatrical release Project A-ko.

Plot
The plot is centered on B-ko's father Hikaru Daitokuji, a billionaire industrialist who bears a strong resemblance to Ted Turner and Tony Stark. B-ko's obsession with C-ko finds another outlet, as she uses her genius intellect to help the Alpha Cygnans repair their spaceship, since C-ko has developed a soft spot for the stranded Napolipolita and D. The Alpha Cygnans have turned their ship into a posh 30,000 room hotel, but long only to return home.

The plot also involves a stereotypical summertime swimming pool scene. The heroines are also being stalked by a steadily growing number of mysterious men in white suits, who all attempt to appear inconspicuous by nonchalantly reading newspapers. Later in the movie, they reveal themselves as spies, their mission being the capture of the Cygnan "super-technology."

The climax of the movie involves the military forces — being manipulated by Hikaru Daitokuji — attacking the Alpha Cygnan ship with a giant experimental mecha named the Queen Margarita (whose blueprints he confiscated from B-ko) in a greedy attempt at seizing their alien technology. This results in the movie's one truly classic moment, in which B-ko's father flies into the fray wearing one of his daughter's revealing Akagiyama battle suits and attempts to catch the Ship — which is plummeting back to Earth — and ends up blowing out his back (it appears that his spine is broken, but since he is seen walking again in FINAL, clearly this is not so).

Cast

Production and release
For the North American release of Project A-ko 2 and further installations of the series, Central Park Media commissioned Ocean Productions for the English dub.

CPM released Project A-ko 2, along with Project A-ko 3: Cinderella Rhapsody and Project A-ko 4: FINAL on the DVD compilation Project A-ko: Love & Robots on August 6, 2002. Discotek Media reissued Project A-ko 2 on DVD on September 26, 2017, and later on Blu-ray on August 30, 2022, featuring a new remastered scan of the original 35mm film.

References

External links
 
 
 Graviton City - A Project A-ko fansite

1987 anime OVAs
Direct-to-video sequel films
Project A-ko
1980s science fiction films
Discotek Media